Petrus Josephus Mattheus "Piet" Aalberse Sr. (27 March 1871 – 5 July 1948) was a Dutch politician of the defunct General League of Roman Catholic Caucuses (ABRK) later the Roman Catholic State Party (RKSP) and later co-founder of the Catholic People's Party (KVP) now merged into the Christian Democratic Appeal (CDA) party and jurist. He was granted the honorary title of Minister of State on 31 December 1934.

Alberse applied at the Leiden University in June 1891 majoring in Law and obtaining a Bachelor of Laws degree in July 1893 and worked as a student researcher before graduating with a Master of Laws degree in July 1897. Alberse worked as a lawyer in Leiden from August 1897 until April 1901. Alberse also worked as editor of the newspapers De Tijd and the De Maasbode from November 1898 until 25 September 1918. Alberse served on the Municipal Council of Leiden from September 1899 until September 1918 and served as an Alderman in Leiden from September 1901 until February 1903. Alberse became a Member of the House of Representatives after the death of Herman Schaepman, serving from 24 February until 21 June 1916. Alberse worked as a professor of Administrative law and Labour law at the Delft Institute of Technology from 21 June 1916 until 25 September 1918. After the election of 1918 Alberse was appointed as the first Minister of Labour in the Cabinet Ruijs de Beerenbrouck I, taking office on 25 September 1918. After the election of 1922 Alberse continued as Minister of Labour in the Cabinet Ruijs de Beerenbrouck II, taking office on 18 September 1922. On 1 January 1923 the Ministry of Labour and the Ministry of Agriculture, Commerce and Industry where combined to form the Ministry of Labour, Commerce and Industry with Alberse continuing in the post as the newly renamed Minister of Labour, Commerce and Industry. After the election of 1925 Alberse was not giving a cabinet post in the new cabinet, the Cabinet Ruijs de Beerenbrouck II was replaced by the Cabinet Colijn I on 4 August 1925. Alberse subsequently returned as Member of the House of Representatives as a frontbencher, taking office on 15 September 1925. After the Leader of the Roman Catholic State Party and Parliamentary leader of the Roman Catholic State Party in the House of Representatives Willem Hubert Nolens announced his retirement from national politics Charles Ruijs de Beerenbrouck was nominated as his successor as Leader and Alberse was selected as Parliamentary leader in the House of Representatives, taking office on 15 September 1931. After the Leader of the Roman Catholic State Party Charles Ruijs de Beerenbrouck was elected as Speaker of the House of Representatives he subsequently stepped down as Leader in favor of Alberse on 31 May 1933.

Biography

Early life
He was born in Leiden to confectioner Bartholomeus Hendricus Johannes Aalberse and Johanna Kerkvliet. He attended a Catholic elementary school in Katwijk and studied Dutch Language and Jurisprudence at Leiden University. After graduating in 1897, Aalberse became a lawyer and attorney in Leiden.

Politics

Alderman and House of Representatives
Aalberse was elected into the municipal council of Leiden in 1899, and became alderman of Marital Status, Social Affairs and Public Hygiene of the city in 1901. He gave up both positions in 1903, when he was elected into the House of Representatives for the constituency of Almelo. In the House, he was mainly concerned with policy regarding labour, trade and industry. After losing his seat in 1916, Aalberse briefly taught at the Delft University of Technology.

Minister
In 1918, Aalberse became the Netherlands' first minister of Labour, a position renamed minister of Labour, Trade and Industry in 1922. As minister, Aalberse was responsible for the introduction of child benefits for public servants, the introduction of a subsidy programme to stimulate private construction of residences, and the fixing of eight-and-a-half-hour work days and 48-hour working weeks. His term ended in 1925. After serving as minister, Aalberse returned to the House of Representatives.

Speaker of the House and Council of State
In the House, he was leader of the Catholic group from 1931 to 1936, and served as Speaker of the House of Representatives from 1936 to 1937, when he lost his seat. Aalberse ended his political career as member of the Council of State, from 1937 to 1946.

Personal
On 21 July 1898, Aalberse married Elisabeth Johanna Maria Schmier, with whom he had seven daughters and one son. He was member of the "Raad der Vereniging" of De Nederlandsche Padvinders from 1936 till 1947.

Decorations

References

External links

  Mr. P.J.M. (Piet) Aalberse Parlement & Politiek

 
 
 
 

 

 

 
 

1871 births
1948 deaths
Catholic People's Party politicians
Commanders of the Order of Orange-Nassau
Academic staff of the Delft University of Technology
Dutch academic administrators
Dutch legal scholars
Dutch legal writers
Dutch magazine editors
Dutch newspaper editors
Dutch nonprofit directors
Dutch nonprofit executives
Dutch political party founders
Dutch prosecutors
Dutch Roman Catholics
General League of Roman Catholic Caucuses politicians
Knights of the Order of the Netherlands Lion
Labour law scholars
Law and economics scholars
Leiden University alumni
Academic staff of Leiden University
Members of the Council of State (Netherlands)
Members of the House of Representatives (Netherlands)
Ministers of Economic Affairs of the Netherlands
Ministers of Social Affairs of the Netherlands
Ministers of State (Netherlands)
Municipal councillors of Leiden
Politicians from The Hague
Roman Catholic State Party politicians
Scouting and Guiding in the Netherlands
Scholars of administrative law
Speakers of the House of Representatives (Netherlands)
Writers from The Hague
20th-century Dutch civil servants
20th-century Dutch educators
20th-century Dutch lawyers
20th-century Dutch male writers
20th-century Dutch politicians